Kurt Hasse (7 February 1907 – 9 January 1944 on the Eastern Front of World War II in the Soviet Union) was a German show jumping champion, and 1936 Olympic champion. He was killed in action during World War II.

Olympic Record
Hasse participated at the 1936 Summer Olympics in Berlin, where he won a gold medal in Individual Jumping, and also a team gold medal with the horse Tora.

References

External links

1907 births
1944 deaths
Sportspeople from Mainz
Olympic gold medalists for Germany
Equestrians at the 1936 Summer Olympics
Olympic equestrians of Germany
German male equestrians
Olympic medalists in equestrian
Medalists at the 1936 Summer Olympics
German military personnel killed in World War II